Jeanne de Montfort (1341 – November 8, 1402), also known as Jeanne de Bretagne,  was the sister of John IV, Duke of Brittany.

Biography 
Her parents were John of Montfort and Joanna of Flanders.

She grew up in England together with her brother, John IV, Duke of Brittany, and was brought up with King Edward III's children. When her brother returned to Brittany to take the dukedom, she remained in England. At the age of 39 she married Ralph Basset, 3rd Baron Basset of Drayton.

In 1398 she was appointed as a Constable of Richmond Castle by the will of King Richard II.

Jeanne died on November 8, 1402. She was buried at Lavendon Abbey, Buckinghamshire.

Titles 
Baroness of Drayton (since 1380)
Constable of Richmond Castle (since 1398)

Sources 
 BRITTANY
 Michael Jones, Ducal Brittany, 1364–1399: relations with England and France during the reign of Duke John IV, Oxford University Press, 1970

14th-century English women
14th-century English people
Basset of Drayton
1341 births
1402 deaths